Amy Schumer Learns to Cook is an American cooking show starring Amy Schumer and Chris Fischer, which follows Schumer learning to cook from her husband, Fischer, while making cocktails. The series premiered on May 11, 2020, on Food Network.

In June 2020, the series was renewed for a second season, which premiered on August 17, 2020.

An uncensored version of this show titled Amy Schumer Learns to Cook: Uncensored premiered on January 1, 2021, on discovery+.

Production
In May 2020, Food Network announced that comedian Amy Schumer and her husband Chris Fischer would star in an eight-episode cooking show, Amy Schumer Learns to Cook, which follows the couple cooking in their home kitchen while quarantined during the COVID-19 pandemic. The series was self-shot and also features Schumer donating to Coalition of Immokalee Workers Fair Food Program and domestic violence organizations.

Cast
Amy Schumer, comedian, wife and mother
Chris Fischer, chef, husband and father
Gene, Chris and Amy's baby
Jane, student from the Philippines serving as nanny and camera operator.

Episodes

Season 1 (2020)

Season 2 (2020)

Accolades

References

External links
 

2020 American television series debuts
2020s American cooking television series
English-language television shows
Food Network original programming
Works by Amy Schumer
Television series impacted by the COVID-19 pandemic
Television shows filmed in Massachusetts